The Birthday Present (2008) is a novel by British writer Ruth Rendell, written under her pseudonym Barbara Vine. It was her first novel under this name in three years.

Plot summary
Robert, a city accountant narrates the story, with excerpts from one Jane Atherton's diary. He is married to Iris Tesham. Iris' brother Ivor is an up-and-coming Tory MP, who is having an affair with Hebe Furnal. Hebe uses Jane Atherton as her alibi for her trysts.  Ivor Tesham arranges a mock abduction of Hebe as a birthday present for her, but it goes horribly wrong.

References

2008 British novels
British crime novels
Novels by Ruth Rendell
Works published under a pseudonym
Viking Press books